In mathematics, Pascal's triangle is a triangular array of the binomial coefficients that arises in probability theory, combinatorics, and algebra.  In much of the Western world, it is named after the French mathematician Blaise Pascal, although other mathematicians studied it centuries before him in India, Persia, China, Germany, and Italy.

The rows of Pascal's triangle are conventionally enumerated starting with row  at the top (the 0th row). The triangle may be constructed in the following manner: In row 0 (the topmost row), there is a unique nonzero entry 1. Each entry of each subsequent row is constructed by adding the number above and to the left with the number above and to the right, treating blank entries as 0. For example, the initial number of row 1 (or any other row) is 1 (the sum of 0 and 1), whereas the numbers 1 and 3 in row 3 are added to produce the number 4 in row 4.

Formula 
The entry in the th row and th column of Pascal's triangle is denoted . With this notation, the construction of the previous paragraph may be written as follows:

,

for any non-negative integer  and any integer .  This recurrence for the binomial coefficients is known as Pascal's rule.

History 

The pattern of numbers that forms Pascal's triangle was known well before Pascal's time. The Persian mathematician Al-Karaji (953–1029) wrote a now-lost book which contained the first formulation of the binomial coefficients and the first description of Pascal's triangle. It was later repeated by Omar Khayyám (1048–1131), another Persian mathematician; thus the triangle is also referred to as the Khayyam triangle in Iran. Several theorems related to the triangle were known, including the binomial theorem. Khayyam used a method of finding nth roots based on the binomial expansion, and therefore on the binomial coefficients.

Earliest evidence about this triangle was found in the year  200 B.C. in Pingalas Sanskrit Text Chandah-Sutra. The triangle was called Meru Prastaara. It was used to identify the poetic metre and to combine the short and long syllables to produce the required rhythm. Although Biggs did not conclude if this triangle originated by the Hindu scholars, he recommended further research on the origin of the Arthmatic triangle in order not to discredit the work of Hindu scholars. 

Pascal's triangle was known in China during the early 11th century as a result of the work of the Chinese mathematician Jia Xian (1010–1070). During the 13th century, Yang Hui (1238–1298) presented the triangle and hence it is still known as Yang Hui's triangle in China.

In Europe, Pascal's triangle appeared for the first time in the Arithmetic of Jordanus de Nemore (13th century).
The binomial coefficients were calculated by Gersonides during the early 14th century, using the multiplicative formula for them. Petrus Apianus (1495–1552) published the full triangle on the frontispiece of his book on business calculations in 1527. Michael Stifel published a portion of the triangle (from the second to the middle column in each row) in 1544, describing it as a table of figurate numbers. In Italy, Pascal's triangle is referred to as Tartaglia's triangle, named for the Italian algebraist Niccolò Fontana Tartaglia (1500–1577), who published six rows of the triangle in 1556. Gerolamo Cardano, also, published the triangle as well as the additive and multiplicative rules for constructing it in 1570.

Pascal's Traité du triangle arithmétique (Treatise on Arithmetical Triangle) was published posthumously in 1665.   In this, Pascal collected several results then known about the triangle, and employed them to solve problems in probability theory. The triangle was later named for Pascal by Pierre Raymond de Montmort (1708) who called it "Table de M. Pascal pour les combinaisons" (French: Table of Mr. Pascal for combinations) and Abraham de Moivre (1730) who called it "Triangulum Arithmeticum PASCALIANUM" (Latin: Pascal's Arithmetic Triangle), which became the basis of the modern Western name.

Binomial expansions 

Pascal's triangle determines the coefficients which arise in binomial expansions. For example, consider the expansion

.

,

where the coefficients  in this expansion are precisely the numbers on row  of Pascal's triangle. In other words,

.

This is the binomial theorem.

Suppose then that

.

Now

The two summations can be reorganized as follows:

(because of how raising a polynomial to a power works).

This is indeed the simple rule for constructing Pascal's triangle row-by-row.

It is not difficult to turn this argument into a proof (by mathematical induction) of the binomial theorem. 

Since , the coefficients are identical in the expansion of the general case.

An interesting consequence of the binomial theorem is obtained by setting both variables  and  equal to one.  In this case, we know that , and so

In other words, the sum of the entries in the th row of Pascal's triangle is the th power of 2.

Combinations 
A second useful application of Pascal's triangle is in the calculation of combinations. For example, the number of combinations of  items taken  at a time (pronounced n choose k) can be found by the equation

.

But this is also the formula for a cell of Pascal's triangle. Rather than performing the calculation, one can simply look up the appropriate entry in the triangle. Provided we have the first row and the first entry in a row numbered 0, the answer will be located at entry  in row . For example, suppose 8 jobs need to be filled but there are 10 candidates; the selection committee wants to know how many ways there are of selecting 8 from the 10. The answer is entry 8 in row 10, which is 45; that is, 10 choose 8 is 45.

Relation to binomial distribution and convolutions 
By the central limit theorem, this distribution approaches the normal distribution as  increases. This can also be seen by applying Stirling's formula to the factorials involved in the formula for combinations.

This is related to the operation of discrete convolution in two ways. Second, repeatedly convolving the distribution function for a random variable with itself corresponds to calculating the distribution function for a sum of n independent copies of that variable; this is exactly the situation to which the central limit theorem applies, and hence results in the normal distribution in the limit.

Patterns and properties 
Pascal's triangle has many properties and contains many patterns of numbers.

Rows 
 The sum of the elements of a single row is twice the sum of the row preceding it. For example, row 0 (the topmost row) has a value of 1, row 1 has a value of 2, row 2 has a value of 4, and so forth. This is because every item in a row produces two items in the next row: one left and one right.
Taking the product of the elements in each row, the sequence of products  is related to the base of the natural logarithm, e.
  can be found in Pascal's triangle by use of the Nilakantha infinite series. 
 The value of a row, if each entry is considered a decimal place (and numbers larger than 9 carried over accordingly), is a power of 11 (for row ). Thus, in row 2,  becomes 112, while  in row five becomes (after carrying) 161,051, which is 115.
 In base 3: 
 
 In base 9: 
               
 
 In particular (see previous property), for  place value remains constant (1place=1). Thus entries can simply be added in interpreting the value of a row.
 Some of the numbers in Pascal's triangle correlate to numbers in Lozanić's triangle.
 The sum of the squares of the elements of row  equals the middle element of row .  For example, .  In general form: 
 On any row , where  is even, the middle term minus the term two spots to the left equals a Catalan number, specifically the th Catalan number.
 In a row  where  is a prime number, all the terms in that row except the 1s are multiples of . This can be proven easily, since if , then  has no factors save for 1 and itself.
 Parity: To count odd terms in row , convert  to binary. Let  be the number of 1s in the binary representation. Then the number of odd terms will be . These numbers are the values in Gould's sequence.
 Every entry in row 2n−1, n ≥ 0, is odd.
Polarity: When the elements of a row of Pascal's triangle are added and subtracted together sequentially, every row with a middle number, meaning rows that have an odd number of integers, gives 0 as the result.  As examples, row 4 is 1 4   6 4  1, so the formula would be 6 – (4+4) + (1+1) = 0; and row 6 is 1 6  15 20 15 6  1, so the formula would be 20 – (15+15) + (6+6) – (1+1) = 0.  So every even row of the Pascal triangle equals 0 when you take the middle number, then subtract the integers directly next to the center, then add the next integers, then subtract, so on and so forth until you reach the end of the row.

Diagonals 

The diagonals of Pascal's triangle contain the figurate numbers of simplices:
 The diagonals going along the left and right edges contain only 1's.
 The diagonals next to the edge diagonals contain the natural numbers in order.
 Moving inwards, the next pair of diagonals contain the triangular numbers in order.
 The next pair of diagonals contain the tetrahedral numbers in order, and the next pair give pentatope numbers.

The symmetry of the triangle implies that the nth d-dimensional number is equal to the dth n-dimensional number.

An alternative formula that does not involve recursion is

where n(d) is the rising factorial.

The geometric meaning of a function Pd is:  Pd(1) = 1 for all d.  Construct a d-dimensional triangle (a 3-dimensional triangle is a tetrahedron) by placing additional dots below an initial dot, corresponding to Pd(1) = 1.  Place these dots in a manner analogous to the placement of numbers in Pascal's triangle.  To find Pd(x), have a total of x dots composing the target shape.  Pd(x) then equals the total number of dots in the shape.  A 0-dimensional triangle is a point and a 1-dimensional triangle is simply a line, and therefore P0(x) = 1 and P1(x) = x, which is the sequence of natural numbers.  The number of dots in each layer corresponds to Pd − 1(x).

Calculating a row or diagonal by itself 
There are simple algorithms to compute all the elements in a row or diagonal without computing other elements or factorials.

For each subsequent element, the value is determined by multiplying the previous value by a fraction with slowly changing numerator and denominator:

(The remaining elements are most easily obtained by symmetry.)

Overall patterns and properties 

 The pattern obtained by coloring only the odd numbers in Pascal's triangle closely resembles the fractal known as the Sierpinski triangle. This resemblance becomes increasingly accurate as more rows are considered; in the limit, as the number of rows approaches infinity, the resulting pattern is the Sierpinski triangle, assuming a fixed perimeter. More generally, numbers could be colored differently according to whether or not they are multiples of 3, 4, etc.; this results in other similar patterns.

Pascal's triangle overlaid on a grid gives the number of distinct paths to each square, assuming only rightward and downward movements are considered.

 In a triangular portion of a grid (as in the images below), the number of shortest grid paths from a given node to the top node of the triangle is the corresponding entry in Pascal's triangle.  On a Plinko game board shaped like a triangle, this distribution should give the probabilities of winning the various prizes.

 If the rows of Pascal's triangle are left-justified, the diagonal bands (colour-coded below) sum to the Fibonacci numbers.
{| style="align:center;"
|- align=center
|bgcolor=red|1
|- align=center
| style="background:orange;"|1
| style="background:yellow;"|1
|- align=center
| style="background:yellow;"|1
|bgcolor=lime|2
|bgcolor=aqua|1
|- align=center
|bgcolor=lime|1
|bgcolor=aqua|3
| style="background:violet;"|3
|bgcolor=red|1
|- align=center
|bgcolor=aqua|1
| style="background:violet;"|4
|bgcolor=red|6
| style="background:orange;"|4
| style="background:yellow;"|1
|- align=center
| style="background:violet;"|1
|bgcolor=red|5
| style="background:orange;"|10
| style="background:yellow;"|10
|bgcolor=lime|5
|bgcolor=aqua|1
|- align=center
|bgcolor=red|1
| style="background:orange;"|6
| style="background:yellow;"|15
|bgcolor=lime|20
|bgcolor=aqua|15
| style="background:violet;"|6
|bgcolor=red|1
|- align=center
| style="background:orange; width:40px;"|1
| style="background:yellow; width:40px;"|7
| style="background:lime; width:40px;"|21
| style="background:aqua; width:40px;"|35
| style="background:violet; width:40px;"|35
| style="background:red; width:40px;"|21
| style="background:orange; width:40px;"|7
| style="background:yellow; width:40px;"|1
|}

Construction as matrix exponential 

Due to its simple construction by factorials, a very basic representation of Pascal's triangle in terms of the matrix exponential can be given: Pascal's triangle is the exponential of the matrix which has the sequence 1, 2, 3, 4, ... on its subdiagonal and zero everywhere else.

Relation to geometry of polytopes 

Pascal's triangle can be used as a lookup table for the number of elements (such as edges and corners) within a polytope (such as a triangle, a tetrahedron, a square, or a cube).

Number of elements of simplices 

Let's begin by considering the 3rd line of Pascal's triangle, with values 1, 3, 3, 1.  A 2-dimensional triangle has one 2-dimensional element (itself), three 1-dimensional elements (lines, or edges), and three 0-dimensional elements (vertices, or corners).  The meaning of the final number (1) is more difficult to explain (but see below).  Continuing with our example, a tetrahedron has one 3-dimensional element (itself), four 2-dimensional elements (faces), six 1-dimensional elements (edges), and four 0-dimensional elements (vertices).  Adding the final 1 again, these values correspond to the 4th row of the triangle (1, 4, 6, 4, 1).  Line 1 corresponds to a point, and Line 2 corresponds to a line segment (dyad).  This pattern continues to arbitrarily high-dimensioned hyper-tetrahedrons (known as simplices).

To understand why this pattern exists, one must first understand that the process of building an n-simplex from an -simplex consists of simply adding a new vertex to the latter, positioned such that this new vertex lies outside of the space of the original simplex, and connecting it to all original vertices. As an example, consider the case of building a tetrahedron from a triangle, the latter of whose elements are enumerated by row 3 of Pascal's triangle: 1 face, 3 edges, and 3 vertices.  To build a tetrahedron from a triangle, we position a new vertex above the plane of the triangle and connect this vertex to all three vertices of the original triangle.

The number of a given dimensional element in the tetrahedron is now the sum of two numbers: first the number of that element found in the original triangle, plus the number of new elements, each of which is built upon elements of one fewer dimension from the original triangle. This process of summing the number of elements of a given dimension to those of one fewer dimension to arrive at the number of the former found in the next higher simplex is equivalent to the process of summing two adjacent numbers in a row of Pascal's triangle to yield the number below. Thus, the meaning of the final number (1) in a row of Pascal's triangle becomes understood as representing the new vertex that is to be added to the simplex represented by that row to yield the next higher simplex represented by the next row. This new vertex is joined to every element in the original simplex to yield a new element of one higher dimension in the new simplex, and this is the origin of the pattern found to be identical to that seen in Pascal's triangle.

Number of elements of hypercubes 

A similar pattern is observed relating to squares, as opposed to triangles. There are a couple ways to do this. The simpler is to begin with Row 0 = 1 and Row 1 = 1, 2. Proceed to construct the analog triangles according to the following rule:

That is, choose a pair of numbers according to the rules of Pascal's triangle, but double the one on the left before adding.  This results in:

The other way of producing this triangle is to start with Pascal's triangle and multiply each entry by 2k, where k is the position in the row of the given number. For example, the 2nd value in row 4 of Pascal's triangle is 6 (the slope of 1s corresponds to the zeroth entry in each row). Now that the analog triangle has been constructed, the number of elements of any dimension that compose an arbitrarily dimensioned cube (called a hypercube) can be read from the table in a way analogous to Pascal's triangle. For example, the number of 2-dimensional elements in a 2-dimensional cube (a square) is one, the number of 1-dimensional elements (sides, or lines) is 4, and the number of 0-dimensional elements (points, or vertices) is 4. This matches the 2nd row of the table (1, 4, 4). A cube has 1 cube, 6 faces, 12 edges, and 8 vertices, which corresponds to the next line of the analog triangle (1, 6, 12, 8). This pattern continues indefinitely.

To understand why this pattern exists, first recognize that the construction of an n-cube from an -cube is done by simply duplicating the original figure and displacing it some distance (for a regular n-cube, the edge length) orthogonal to the space of the original figure, then connecting each vertex of the new figure to its corresponding vertex of the original. This initial duplication process is the reason why, to enumerate the dimensional elements of an n-cube, one must double the first of a pair of numbers in a row of this analog of Pascal's triangle before summing to yield the number below. The initial doubling thus yields the number of "original" elements to be found in the next higher n-cube and, as before, new elements are built upon those of one fewer dimension (edges upon vertices, faces upon edges, etc.). Again, the last number of a row represents the number of new vertices to be added to generate the next higher n-cube.

In this triangle, the sum of the elements of row m is equal to 3m.

Counting vertices in a cube by distance 
Each row of Pascal's triangle gives the number of vertices at each distance from a fixed vertex in an n-dimensional cube.  For example, in three dimensions, the third row (1 3 3 1) corresponds to the usual three-dimensional cube: fixing a vertex V, there is one vertex at distance 0 from V (that is, V itself), three vertices at distance 1, three vertices at distance  and one vertex at distance  (the vertex opposite V).  The second row corresponds to a square, while larger-numbered rows correspond to hypercubes in each dimension.

Fourier transform of sin(x)n+1/x 

As stated previously, the coefficients of (x + 1)n are the nth row of the triangle. Now the coefficients of (x − 1)n are the same, except that the sign alternates from +1 to −1 and back again.  After suitable normalization, the same pattern of numbers occurs in the Fourier transform of sin(x)n+1/x. More precisely: if n is even, take the real part of the transform, and if n is odd, take the imaginary part. Then the result is a step function, whose values (suitably normalized) are given by the nth row of the triangle with alternating signs. For example, the values of the step function that results from:

compose the 4th row of the triangle, with alternating signs.  This is a generalization of the following basic result (often used in electrical engineering):

is the boxcar function.  The corresponding row of the triangle is row 0, which consists of just the number 1.

If n is congruent to 2 or to 3 mod 4, then the signs start with −1. In fact, the sequence of the (normalized) first terms corresponds to the powers of i, which cycle around the intersection of the axes with the unit circle in the complex plane:

Extensions

To higher dimensions 
Pascal's triangle has higher dimensional generalizations. The three-dimensional version is known as Pascal's pyramid or Pascal's tetrahedron, while the general versions are known as Pascal's simplices.

Negative-numbered rows 

Pascal's triangle can be extended to negative row numbers.

First write the triangle in the following form:

Next, extend the column of 1s upwards:

Now the rule:

can be rearranged to:

which allows calculation of the other entries for negative rows:

This extension preserves the property that the values in the mth column viewed as a function of n are fit by an order m polynomial, namely
.

This extension also preserves the property that the values in the nth row correspond to the coefficients of (1 + x)n:

For example:

When viewed as a series, the rows of negative n diverge.  However, they are still Abel summable, which summation gives the standard values of 2n.  (In fact, the n = -1 row results in Grandi's series which "sums" to 1/2, and the n = -2 row results in another well-known series which has an Abel sum of 1/4.)

Another option for extending Pascal's triangle to negative rows comes from extending the other line of 1s:

Applying the same rule as before leads to

This extension also has the properties that just as

we have

Also, just as summing along the lower-left to upper-right diagonals of the Pascal matrix yields the Fibonacci numbers, this second type of extension still sums to the Fibonacci numbers for negative index.

Either of these extensions can be reached if we define

 

and take certain limits of the gamma function, .

See also 

 Bean machine, Francis Galton's "quincunx"
 Bell triangle
 Bernoulli's triangle
 Binomial expansion
 Euler triangle
 Floyd's triangle
 Gaussian binomial coefficient
 Hockey-stick identity
 Leibniz harmonic triangle
 Multiplicities of entries in Pascal's triangle (Singmaster's conjecture)
 Pascal matrix
 Pascal's pyramid
 Pascal's simplex
 Proton NMR, one application of Pascal's triangle
 Star of David theorem
 Trinomial expansion
 Trinomial triangle
 Polynomials calculating sums of powers of arithmetic progressions

References

External links 
 
 
 The Old Method Chart of the Seven Multiplying Squares (from the Ssu Yuan Yü Chien of Chu Shi-Chieh, 1303, depicting the first nine rows of Pascal's triangle)
 Pascal's Treatise on the Arithmetic Triangle (page images of Pascal's treatise, 1654; summary)

Factorial and binomial topics
Blaise Pascal
Triangles of numbers